Whaletown Water Aerodrome  is located adjacent to Whaletown on Cortes Island, British Columbia, Canada.

See also
 List of airports in the Gulf Islands

References

Seaplane bases in British Columbia
Strathcona Regional District
Cortes Island
Registered aerodromes in British Columbia
Airports in the Gulf Islands